Carsten H.W. Lorenz (born August 21, 1961), known professionally as Carsten Lorenz, is a German film producer. He is best known for his work as a regular collaborator of director Roland Emmerich.

Early life and career 
Lorenz started his professional career as a music journalist interviewing punk rock bands and breaking New Wave artists.

Under the mentorship of legendary German film critic Michael Lentz, Lorenz interviewed filmmakers like John Waters, Oliver Stone and Alan Parker. He then got acceptend into the University of Television and Film Munich, where he met director Roland Emmerich, who he collaborates with till today.

After studying at the American Film Institute, Lorenz permanently moved to Los Angeles in 1989. His mix of feature films have earned a combined over $1 billion at the worldwide theatrical box office.

Personal life 
Lorenz lives in Los Angeles with his longtime partner, science teacher Gina Maria Taylor. Together they are raising their now adult children, production Designer Miranda Lorenz, Football player Carlton Lorenz and computer entrepreneur Cameron Taylor.

He has assembled an eclectic art collection including works by Martin Kippenberger, Alexander Calder, Rene Margritte, Takashi Murakami and Niki de Saint Phalle.

Filmography

References

External links

1961 births
German film producers
Living people